The Last Supper is a 1995 American satirical black comedy film directed by Stacy Title. It stars Cameron Diaz, Ron Eldard, Annabeth Gish, Jonathan Penner and Courtney B. Vance as five liberal graduate school students who invite a string of extreme conservatives to dinner in order to murder them. The film premiered at the 1995 Toronto International Film Festival.

Plot
Jude, Pete, Paulie, Marc, and Luke are graduate school students who live together in a rustic home in Iowa.

After Zack, a Desert Storm veteran, helps move Pete's car, the group invite him to have dinner at their home. However, Zack turns out to be a racist and Holocaust denier who praises Adolf Hitler, leading to a tense political debate with the liberal students.

The evening takes a turn for the worse when the veteran snaps and holds a knife to Marc's throat, threatening to kill him and rape Paulie. Zack releases Marc, then Pete holds a knife to his throat, but he easily incapacitates Pete and breaks his arm. Marc fatally stabs Zack in the back to defend his friend, and the group decides to cover up the murder. Paulie regrets that Zack is dead even though he threatened her and Marc.

After a long discussion, the students decide to follow up this event by inviting other conservatives for dinner to murder them, reasoning this would "make the world a better place". They lay down a procedure for each murder. The guest will be given every opportunity to change his/her mind and recant his/her beliefs. If the guest fails to change their ways by dessert, the guest is offered poisoned white wine from a blue decanter and raises a toast. The bodies are buried in the vegetable garden.

Guests, all of whom are murdered, include: a homophobic protestant reverend, a misogynistic, chauvinistic rape apologist; a Neo-Nazi; an anti-environmentalist; a racist, anti-Semitic Nation of Islam fundamentalist; an anti-abortion activist; a censorship advocate; a man who beats homeless people (the only dinner guest who momentarily considers recanting his beliefs); and critics of gay rights.

After ten murders, misgivings begin to surface within the group as a few grow indecisive regarding the justification of their actions. Infighting and guilt compel them to spare a teenage opponent of mandatory sex education, despite the protests of Luke and Pete.

Sheriff Alice Stanley, investigating the whereabouts of missing girl Jenny Tyler, comes upon the group. By coincidence, the main suspect in the case is Zack, their first victim, who was also a convicted sex offender. The sheriff grows suspicious of the students’ behavior, questioning Pete, Marc and Paulie at their home. Finding Stanley trespassing in their back yard, Lukeincreasingly unhingedkills Stanley, unbeknownst to the rest.

During a school break, Luke and Pete meet famous conservative pundit Norman Arbuthnot, a regular on TV news and talk shows, and invite him to dinner. During dinner, Norman stymies them with his moderate and persuasive arguments, all of which the usually argumentative group have difficulty debunking. He even admits that he says more radically conservative things mostly for attention.

The frustrated students all excuse themselves to the kitchen to determine Norman's fate. Before excusing himself, Jude warns Norman that the wine in the blue bottle has gone bad. In the kitchen, after a brief discussion, only Luke still wishes to kill Norman, calling him Hitler. After a tense altercation, Luke is dissuaded and breaks down into tears.

Meanwhile, Norman examines the home and pieces together their murderous activities. When they return to the table, Norman presents them with glasses of wine and offers them a toast but does not drink himself, with the excuse that he has to fly his private plane. He puffs on a huge cigar and says, "Don't worry, I didn't pour any of the bad wine."

A closing shot of a painting portrays all five students collapsed on the floor, with Norman standing next to the blue bottle and smoking his cigar. The film ends with audio of Norman speculating about his possible presidential bid to a cheering crowd, pledging to do the people's will.

Cast

Production
The character of Norman Arbuthnot was loosely based on real-life pundit Rush Limbaugh. Beau Bridges was originally asked to play the role, but turned it down. Ron Perlman was so enthusiastic after reading the script that he threatened to break his friendship with director Stacy Title if he did not get the role. One of the producers has a cameo as the man getting his book signed by Arbuthnot. The screenplay's author, Dan Rosen, also had a small role as Deputy Hartford.

Director Stacy Title is the sister of co-star Jason Alexander's wife, Dena E. Title, and is married to the actor playing Marc, Jonathan Penner.

Shonen Knife's cover of The Carpenters' "Top of the World" plays during the closing credits.

In the United States, the film premiered at the 1996 Sundance Film Festival on January 27, 1996.

Response

Critical response
The Last Supper has a 61% "Fresh" rating on Rotten Tomatoes, based on 38 reviews. Roger Ebert of the Chicago Sun-Times gave the film three out of four stars, writing that although it is too long and repetitive, he appreciated its lack of partisanship. He described the film as "a brave effort in a timid time, a Swiftian attempt to slap us all in the face and get us to admit that our own freedoms depend precisely on those of our neighbors, our opponents and, yes, our enemies." M.V Moorhead of the Phoenix New Times opined that the film’s "level of satiric discourse" could have been more " genuinely provocative". Janet Maslin, reviewing the film in The New York Times, was far more critical of the storyline, criticising it for its "lumbering obviousness and sophomoric political debate", and "conventional and unsurprising" plot. In a review for The Washington Post, Rita Kempley described it as "sour, repetitive fare", and "glib, morally muddy, overly schematic".

Box office
The film grossed $459,749 in limited release in the domestic box office.

References

External links

 

1995 films
1990s crime comedy films
1995 independent films
1990s satirical films
1995 comedy films
1995 directorial debut films
American political satire films
American black comedy films
American satirical films
Political satire films
Films directed by Stacy Title
Films scored by Mark Mothersbaugh
Films set in Iowa
1990s English-language films
1990s American films